João Florêncio is a Portuguese handball coach. He is a former coach of the Angolan national team.

He coached them at the 2015 World Women's Handball Championship.

References

Year of birth missing (living people)
Living people
Portuguese handball coaches
Place of birth missing (living people)

Portuguese male handball players